The Jazz Singer is a 1980 American musical drama film directed by Richard Fleischer and produced by Jerry Leider. The film stars Neil Diamond (in his acting debut), Sir Laurence Olivier and Lucie Arnaz, and tells the story of a young singer who is torn between tradition and pursuing his dreams as a pop singer. Based on the 1925 play of the same name by Samson Raphaelson, this film is the fourth adaptation of the play, after the 1927 and the 1952 theatrical adaptions, and a 1959 television adaptation.

Developed as a starring vehicle for Diamond, who had undergone a revival of popularity in the late 1970s, the film was initially intended to be produced by Paramount and AFD, with Sidney J. Furie directing, and Deborah Raffin acting opposite Diamond. However, production was plagued with several delays in filming, the departures of Furie and Raffin, and numerous script rewrites.

The Jazz Singer was released by AFD on December 19, 1980, and was a critical and commercial disappointment, although it did make a substantial profit, doubling its $13 million budget by making $27.1 million. Critics panned the acting of Diamond and – unusually – Olivier, while praising Arnaz's performance and Diamond's accompanying soundtrack and live musical performances in the film. The soundtrack eventually reached multi-platinum status, becoming Diamond's most successful album to date and one of the more successful film soundtrack albums in history.

Plot
Yussel Rabinovitch is a young, fifth-generation Jewish cantor performing at the synagogue of his imperious father. Yussel is married to his childhood friend Rivka, and settled down to a life of religious devotion to the teaching of his faith.

But on the side, he writes songs for a black singing group, and when a member of the quartet is arrested, Yussel covers for him at one of their gigs by wearing blackface. The nightclub engagement is a success, but one of the patrons notices that Yussel's hands are white and speaks out. A fight ensues, and the band is arrested. Yussel's father comes to the jail to bail them out and discovers there is not a Yussel Rabinovitch there, but a Jess Robin. His father questions him about the name, and Yussel confesses that it is a stage name he uses when performing. His father tells him that his singing voice was to be used for God's purposes, not his own.

Bubba, a member of the Four Brothers singing group, is Yussel's best friend, although he knows him only as Jess. Bubba informs him that the band has a gig in Los Angeles, performing back-up vocals for a successful singer (Keith Lennox). Shortly after Bubba leaves, Yussel begins composing a song that will eventually become "Love on the Rocks". His wife Rivka notices him writing the song in his free time and senses that Yussel yearns for a bigger stage for his voice, but her values keep her grounded to the life they have built.

Bubba calls from Los Angeles to inform Jess that Lennox heard and loved "Love on the Rocks" and wants to record it, but they need Jess to come for two weeks to oversee the recording session. Jess views this as the opportunity he has been waiting for, but Rivka and his father are opposed to his going. Later at his father's 25th anniversary party as shul cantor, his father relents and tearfully releases him.

When Jess arrives in Los Angeles, he is picked up by music agent Molly Bell. She takes him to the studio where Lennox is recording, and Jess is shocked to find that his ballad is now being recorded as a hard rock song. During a break in recording, Jess asks the producer and Lennox if he can perform the song as a ballad as he intended, so Lennox can get an idea of the song's framing. They allow him to do so, and while recording the song, Molly decides that Jess's performance is the way the song should be done. However, Lennox is not convinced and fires not only Jess but Bubba and his group.

Later, Molly gets a tip from a friend as to where Eddie Gibbs, a booking agent, is having lunch. She gets into his car, uninvited, and has him listen to Jess's recording of "Love on the Rocks". When Gibbs asks her who it is, Molly tells him that it is the new opening act for Zane Grey's television special. Gibbs is impressed, but says he can't book anyone from just a tape recording and unceremoniously tosses her from his car. However, Molly manages to arrange for Gibbs to visit a club where Jess is playing, thanks to Bubba, who is working there as a waiter. His live performance convinces Gibbs to book Jess as an opening act for the television special.

Meanwhile, back in New York, Cantor Rabinovitch reminds Rivka that her place is by her husband's side. He pressures her to go to California and attempt to bring him home. Rivka arrives on Jess's opening night, and tells Molly that Jess needs to return home. The audience gives Jess a standing ovation, and he heads backstage and is reunited with Rivka. At the after-party, Jess is met by an enthusiastic crowd and given a recording contract. Jess asks Rivka to stay, but she says she wants something different. Realizing she has lost him, she returns home.

Days later, Jess meets Molly by the pier and confesses his love for her, telling her he and Rivka have separated. As time passes, the two grow close to each other, and Jess's career success continues. His father visits, attempting to persuade him to come home, but Jess refuses, insisting he is making a name for himself with his music career. Jess reveals that he and Rivka are divorcing, which devastates his father. To make matters worse, Molly suddenly arrives. Jess attempts to explain the matter to his father, but to no avail, and he angrily disowns his son and leaves weeping.

Heartbroken, Jess struggles at his recording sessions, taking out his anger on his bandmates, until he storms out of a recording session and drives away aimlessly. When his car runs out of gas on the highway, he hitchhikes and lives the life of a drifter for a few months. However, he eventually returns home to Molly when Bubba finds him and tells him she has given birth to his son. Molly once again meets Eddie Gibbs in his car and persuades him to allow Jess to perform on Zane Grey's television special.

At rehearsal, the day before Yom Kippur, Jess learns that his father is in the hospital with high blood pressure and won't be able to sing Kol Nidre at the synagogue. Jess is initially reluctant to go, vowing that he is dead to his father, but Molly insists that he go or else she will feel guilty about being the cause of the estrangement. Jess ultimately agrees and returns to sing at the synagogue. He attempts to make amends with his father, who refuses to speak to Jess until learning he now has a grandson, at which point his father finally breaks down and the two finally reconcile.

The film ends with Jess performing "America", with his enthusiastic father and Molly in attendance.

Cast
 Neil Diamond as Yussel Rabinovitch/Jess Robin
 Laurence Olivier as Cantor Rabinovitch
 Lucie Arnaz as Molly Bell 
 Catlin Adams as Rivka Rabinovitch
 Franklyn Ajaye as Bubba
 Paul Nicholas as Keith Lennox
 Sully Boyar as Eddie Gibbs
 Mike Kellin as Leo
 James Booth as Paul Rossini

Production
The idea for the remake came from producer Jerry Leider, who saw Diamond on a 1976 television special. Leider believed that Diamond could have the same crossover appeal as fellow singers Elvis Presley and Barbra Streisand, the latter of whom had recently starred in the successful remake of A Star Is Born. Encouraged by the success of the remake of A Star Is Born, Leider decided to remake The Jazz Singer. However, an entire year would have to pass before rights to the remake could be figured out, as both Warner Bros. and United Artists claimed ownership.

In the fall of 1977, Metro-Goldwyn-Mayer put the remake in development, with principal photography planned to begin in the fall of 1978. However, in September 1978, the studio dropped the remake, over "executives being anxious about the movie being 'too Jewish'", according to writer Stephen H. Foreman. Associated Film Distribution picked up the rights, and slated the film to begin photography again in May 1979, with Sidney J. Furie directing. However, in early 1979, Diamond underwent back surgery, and invoked a clause in his contract that allowed him to finish the original music before filming began. During this time, the studio and Leider did consider replacing Diamond with Barry Manilow, though ultimately decided against it. Meanwhile, Jacqueline Bisset was approached for the lead female role, but asked for too much money. Furie initially wanted Lucie Arnaz, but she was appearing on Broadway in They're Playing Our Song; Deborah Raffin was cast instead, after producers had seen her on a television film. Sir Laurence Olivier was cast as Cantor Rabinovitch, for a $1 million, ten-week contract.

Filming was finally able to commence on January 7, 1980, though problems immediately started again. Diamond — who was making his acting debut — struggled in his transition from performing to acting. To compensate, Furie — who had wanted to change the script from the beginning — ordered several major rewrites. These rewrites led to creative differences between Furie and Foreman, and the latter departed, to be replaced by Herbert Baker. Baker completely rewrote the script, with a different ending, dramatically changing the character of Molly Bell in the process. Due to these changes, Raffin departed the project, and Furie was able to cast Arnaz, who talked to Raffin before taking the role. However, filming was halted after the studio fired Furie on March 3. Richard Fleischer replaced Furie by the end of March, and filming was able to conclude on April 28.

According to Arnaz, Diamond was nervous about his acting debut, and would become irritable when he could not do a scene. The two directors handled this situation very differently: Whereas Furie — who, along with other crew members, was intimidated by Diamond's status as a successful musician — would have the script rewritten to be tailored to Diamond, Fleischer would calm Diamond down and work with him on the scene.

During a scene set in a recording booth, Diamond was having trouble conveying anger during an argument with Arnaz's character. Director Fleischer said that Diamond would go into the adjacent music recording stage where his band was gathered to await his cue and then enter in a supposed rage. During one of the lulls in filming to reset the shot, Fleischer saw him pacing nervously and then suddenly bursting into anger, throwing chairs and smashing equipment. Not wanting to miss an opportunity, the director called "Action" and Diamond stormed in and delivered his lines in a very convincing performance. After the scene ended, Fleischer asked the singer what had set him off. He replied that he was upset he couldn't give the desired performance and asked his band to play something to make him angry. "And what did they play?" Fleischer asked. "A Barry Manilow number," replied Diamond.

Reception

Box office
Lew Grade, who invested in the film, said the box-office "results were disappointing and we weren't able to recoup our prints and advertising costs". However, because the movie had been presold to American television for $4 million, the losses were minimized. Also, the soundtrack album was very successful and made more money than the film. The film earned over $27 million on a budget of $13 million.

Critical
The remake received a predominance of negative reviews from critics, although some were positive. On Metacritic, the film has a weighted average score of 37 out of 100, based on 8 critics, indicating "generally unfavorable reviews". It also has a rating of 23% on Rotten Tomatoes from 22 reviews, the critical consensus on the website saying "Neil Diamond's foray into acting is a total miss in this gaudy and unconvincing remake, with Laurence Olivier on hand to deliver an excruciatingly campy performance."

Roger Ebert from the Chicago Sun-Times, awarding it one star out of four, wrote that the remake "has so many things wrong with it that a review threatens to become a list." His colleague, Gene Siskel of the Chicago Tribune, commended Arnaz's performance in the film, remarking that "what the daughter of Lucy and Desi does so well is perform quietly but confidently when everyone else is chewing the scenery", adding:

Another negative review came from Janet Maslin of The New York Times, who stated: "Mr. Diamond, looking glum and seldom making eye contact with anyone, isn't enough of a focus for the outmoded story." Time Out London called the appearance of Neil Diamond "the most cautious soft-rock superstar movie debut you'll ever get to see." The only top critic to give a positive review of the film (according to Rotten Tomatoes) was Dave Kehr of the Chicago Reader. He wrote, "Richard Fleischer's direction is appropriately close-in and small, and Diamond himself, while no actor, proves to be a commandingly intense, brooding presence".

The film is listed in Golden Raspberry Award founder John J. B. Wilson's book The Official Razzie Movie Guide as one of The 100 Most Enjoyably Bad Movies Ever Made.

Awards and nominations
Neil Diamond was nominated for both a Golden Globe Award and a Golden Raspberry Award for the same role in this movie, winning the latter. The only other actors to be nominated for both awards for one performance were Pia Zadora and James Coco, in 1982, with the former uniquely winning both.

The film is recognized by American Film Institute in these lists:
 2004: AFI's 100 Years...100 Songs:	
 "America" – Nominated

Soundtrack

Diamond's accompanying soundtrack was released on November 10, 1980, by Capitol Records. The soundtrack peaked at number three on the Billboard 200 albums chart, and has been certified 5× Platinum since its release. The album spawned three singles—"Love on the Rocks", "Hello Again" and "America"—which all peaked within the top ten of the US Billboard Hot 100.

Notes

References

External links
 
 
 
 
 

1980 films
1980 independent films
1980 romantic drama films
1980s romantic musical films
Remakes of American films
American films based on plays
American independent films
American musical drama films
American romantic drama films
American romantic musical films
American rock music films
Films about Jews and Judaism
Films directed by Sidney J. Furie
Films directed by Richard Fleischer
Films scored by Leonard Rosenman
Films set in Los Angeles
Films set in New York City
EMI Films films
Golden Raspberry Award winning films
1980s English-language films
1980s American films